Beaverton is a city in Gladwin County in the U.S. state of Michigan.  The population was 1,071 at the 2010 census.  The city is bordered by Beaverton Township on the west, but the two are administered autonomously.

History
Beaverton was first settled by lumbermen circa 1863 and was first known as Grand Forks, after the confluence of the Tobacco and Cedar rivers. It has been continuously settled since 1875. The town was founded in 1890 by the Donald Gunn Ross & Sons lumber company, from Beaverton, Ontario. Donald Ross became the first postmaster on February 17, 1891. Romig cites the city clerk of Beaverton that it incorporated as a village in 1901. However, Powers gives the date as 1896. It incorporated as a city in 1903, with William Ross as the first mayor. Powers gives the first settler's name as Marvil Secord, originally from Brantford, Ontario, and who is also recognized as the first permanent settler in Gladwin County. Beaverton is known as the Plastic Thermoforming capital of the world. It was a station on the Toledo-Ludington line of the Pere Marquette Railroad.

Geography

Major highways

Climate
This climatic region is typified by large seasonal temperature differences, with warm to hot (and often humid) summers and cold (sometimes severely cold) winters.  According to the Köppen Climate Classification system, Beaverton has a humid continental climate, abbreviated "Dfb" on climate maps.

Demographics

2010 census
As of the census of 2010, there were 1,071 people, 462 households, and 258 families residing in the city. The racial makeup of the city was 97.7% White, 0.4% African American, 0.7% Native American, and 1.2% from two or more races. Hispanic or Latino of any race were 0.7% of the population.

There were 462 households, of which 28.4% had children under the age of 18 living with them, 34.2% were married couples living together, 16.2% had a female householder with no husband present, 5.4% had a male householder with no wife present, and 44.2% were non-families. 40.5% of all households were made up of individuals, and 18.8% had someone living alone who was 65 years of age or older. The average household size was 2.32 and the average family size was 3.13.

The median age in the city was 36.2 years. 27.1% of residents were under the age of 18; 8.2% were between the ages of 18 and 24; 22.9% were from 25 to 44; 24.5% were from 45 to 64; and 17.5% were 65 years of age or older. The gender makeup of the city was 47.4% male and 52.6% female.

2000 census
As of the census of 2000, there were 1,106 people, 496 households, and 291 families residing in the city. The racial makeup of the city was 97.02% White, 0.99% African American, 0.63% Native American, 0.09% Asian, 0.09% from other races, and 1.18% from two or more races. Hispanic or Latino of any race were 0.54% of the population.

There were 496 households, out of which 29.2% had children under the age of 18 living with them, 41.5% were married couples living together, 13.9% had a female householder with no husband present, and 41.3% were non-families. 39.5% of all households were made up of individuals, and 19.2% had someone living alone who was 65 years of age or older.  The average household size was 2.23 and the average family size was 2.96.

In the city, the population was spread out, with 27.1% under the age of 18, 9.0% from 18 to 24, 25.1% from 25 to 44, 20.3% from 45 to 64, and 18.4% who were 65 years of age or older.  The median age was 37 years. For every 100 females, there were 87.1 males.  For every 100 females age 18 and over, there were 77.5 males.

The median income for a household in the city was $20,625, and the median income for a family was $27,813. Males had a median income of $29,722 versus $18,558 for females. The per capita income for the city was $12,125.  About 18.1% of families and 21.9% of the population were below the poverty line, including 26.9% of those under age 18 and 15.2% of those age 65 or over.

Images

Notable people
 
 
Homer Bliss (1904–1970), professional American football player

References

Further reading
Romig, Walter, L.H.D. Michigan Place Names.  Detroit: Wayne State University Press, 1986.
 Powers, Perry Francis.  A History of Northern Michigan and Its People. Chicago: Lewis Publishing Co., 1912.   
 Frei, Robert W. and the Beaverton Centennial Committee. Beaverton: A Century in the Making.  Beaverton: Beaverton Centennial Committee, 2003

External links
City of Beaverton official website
Beaverton Historical Society

Cities in Gladwin County, Michigan
1863 establishments in Michigan
Populated places established in 1863